Vasek Pospisil was the defending champion but lost in the first round to Gijs Brouwer.

Grégoire Barrère won the title after defeating Arthur Fils 6–1, 6–4 in the final.

Seeds

Draw

Finals

Top half

Bottom half

References

External links
Main draw
Qualifying draw

Open Quimper Bretagne - 1
2023 Singles